John Crockett Chapple (May 27, 1875 – May 1, 1946) was an American newspaper editor and politician.

Born in La Porte City, Iowa, Chapple went to Northland Academy (now Northland College) in Ashland, Wisconsin and Cornell College in Mt. Vernon, Iowa. He was the editor of the Ashland Daily Press and was also a columnist and printer. Chapple served on the Ashland Common Council, the Ashland County, Wisconsin Board of Superviors, and was a Republican. He was also the postmaster. Chapple served in the Wisconsin State Assembly in 1909, 1917, and 1919. He was also elected in 1942 and 1944. Chapple died in Ashland, Wisconsin while still in office in 1946.

Notes

1875 births
1946 deaths
People from La Porte City, Iowa
People from Ashland, Wisconsin
Cornell College alumni
Northland College (Wisconsin) alumni
Editors of Wisconsin newspapers
Wisconsin postmasters
County supervisors in Wisconsin
Wisconsin city council members
Republican Party members of the Wisconsin State Assembly